Bruce John Alexander (born 28 May 1946) is a British actor, best known for his portrayal of Superintendent Norman Mullett in the ITV television series A Touch of Frost, in which he plays the superior of the main character Jack Frost, played by David Jason.

Career 
Alexander was born in Watford, Hertfordshire, and has appeared with the Royal Shakespeare Company. He played Ferdinand in the 1989 production of John Webster's The Duchess of Malfi. In November 2016, he was in a "Read Not Dead" performance of Beaumont and Fletcher's The Coxcomb at the Sam Wanamaker theatre on Bankside.

In 1990, he appeared as a doctor in the first episode of the comedy Keeping Up Appearances (entitled "Daddy's Accident"), and has also featured in episodes of numerous TV series, including The Bill, Casualty, EastEnders, Midsomer Murders and Doc Martin. In 1997, Alexander had a small role in the James Bond film Tomorrow Never Dies.

In 2013, he played the character of Peter Bachman in several episodes of the TV series Love and Marriage, uncluding "The Elephant in the Room", "Secrets & Lies", "Alarm!" and "Huge Weekend for the Paradise Family".

Alexander's radio credits include the role of Mike in Westway, the BBC World Service soap opera which ran from 1997 to 2005, and the role of Doc de Salis in the BBC dramatisation of the John le Carré novel The Honourable Schoolboy.

Alexander is the president of the Haddenham Museum in Haddenham, Buckinghamshire and is also a patron of Thame Players Theatre in Thame, Oxfordshire, along with Sir Tim Rice.

In 2019, Alexander appeared in the BBC soap opera Doctors as Ray Hopkins. In 2022, he appeared as recurring character Doug in Catherine Tate's six-part mockumentary sitcom Hard Cell, released on Netflix.

Partial filmography

References

External links

Bruce Alexander at Theatricalia

1946 births
English male television actors
Living people
English male stage actors
Male actors from Hertfordshire
Actors from Watford
20th-century English male actors
21st-century English male actors